The Taiwan Education Association Building is a building in Zhongzheng District, Taipei, Taiwan.

History
The building was built in 1931 and originally housed exhibits of educational achievements in Taiwan, and served as a venue for regular gatherings. After the handover of Taiwan from Japan to the Republic of China in 1945, the building was used as the Taiwan Provincial Consultative Council from April 1946 to May 1958. Later, it was rented by the United States Information Service as the American Cultural Center, which moved out when the lease was due.

In 1992, the building was rented by the Scouts of China which is the national Boy Scouts organization in the Republic of China.
It now hosts the National 228 Memorial Museum.

Architecture
Its design was directed by Ide Kaoru, the chief of the Japanese colonial government's civil engineering section, and was thus quite similar to that of the Taipei Assembly Hall. Its eclectic modern style includes exterior walls with brown face brick and a parapet with washed terrazzo in a geometrical pattern.

References 

1931 establishments in Taiwan
Buildings and structures in Taipei